Salient Ridge is a prominent ridge, 6 nautical miles (11 km) long, extending east-northeast from Salient Peak along the south side of Salient Glacier in Royal Society Range, Victoria Land. Named in association with the peak and glacier at the suggestion of R.H. Findlay, leader of three New Zealand Antarctic Research Program (NZARP) geological parties to the area, 1977–81.

Ridges of Victoria Land
Scott Coast